Independent Economic Party is a political party in Kenya. The party chairman is Stephen Omondi Oludhe.

Political parties in Kenya
Political parties with year of establishment missing